The women's heptathlon event at the 1987 Pan American Games was held in Indianapolis, United States on 9 and 10 August.

Results

References

Athletics at the 1987 Pan American Games
1987
Pan